Duke Wu of Chen (reigned 795 BC – died 781 BC), given name Ling (靈), was the eighth ruler of the ancient Chinese state of Chen during the Western Zhou dynasty. Wu was his posthumous name.

Duke Wu succeeded his father Duke Xi of Chen, who died in 796 BC. Duke Xi's reign coincided with that of King Xuan of Zhou. He reigned for 15 years and died in 781 BC, the year that King You, the last king of Western Zhou, ascended the throne. Duke Wu was succeeded by his son Yue, known as Duke Yi of Chen. Duke Yi died after only three years of reign, and was succeeded by his younger brother Xie, known as Duke Ping of Chen.

References

Bibliography

Monarchs of Chen (state)
8th-century BC Chinese monarchs
781 BC deaths